Kim Min-kyu or Kim Min-gyu may refer to:

Entertainers
Kim Min-kyu (actor) (born 1994), South Korean actor
Kim Min-gyu (born 1997), rapper of Seventeen
Kim Min-kyu (entertainer) (born 2001), South Korean singer and model

Sportspeople
Kim Min-gyu (table tennis) (1977–2017), South Korean para table tennis player
Kim Min-kyu (judoka) (born 1982), South Korean judoka
Kim Min-kyu (luger) (born 1983), South Korean luger
Kim Min-kyu (fencer) (born 1990), South Korean foil fencer
Kim Min-gyu (baseball) (born 1999), South Korean baseball player
Kim Min-kyu (golfer) (born 2001), South Korean golfer
Kim Min-kyu (footballer, born 1982), South Korean former footballer (goalkeeper)
Kim Min-kyu (footballer, born 1985), South Korean former footballer
Kim Min-kyu (footballer, born 1993), South Korean footballer for Changwon Citizen
Kim Min-kyu (footballer, born 1998), South Korean footballer for Seoul E-Land
Kim Min-kyu (footballer, born 2000), South Korean footballer for Biu Chun Rangers in Hong Kong